According to its website, an unAPI is:

The unAPI specification is only two pages long.

Server-side applications which use unAPI 

 Bebop
 Evergreen
 Koha
 refbase
 WordPress (via a plugin)
 VITAL, digital repository
 invenio digital library framework
 Omeka S, web-publishing platform for academic and cultural repositories
 Glottolog a clld app supports unAPI on its root page.

Client tools which can use unAPI 
 Zotero

See also 
 COinS

References

Further reading

External links 
 Mailing list archives, fall 2004-summer 2006
 Current listserv for unAPI and related discussions

Library 2.0